Ronald N. Tutor (born 1940/1941) is an American businessman. He is chairman and chief executive officer (CEO) of Tutor Perini, and president of the Tutor-Saliba Corporation.

Early life
Ronald N. Tutor was born in Sherman Oaks, California, and is of Armenian descent. His father, A.G. Tutor, founded A.G. Tutor Co., a real estate development company, in 1949. The company built "houses and small commercial buildings".

Tutor was educated at Harvard Westlake and Van Nuys High School. He graduated from the University of Southern California in 1963.

Career
Tutor started a career in construction shortly after graduation, working for Tutor-Saliba and A.G. Tutor Co. He now serves as Chairman, CEO and President of Tutor Perini, and President of the Tutor-Perini Corporation. He received the United States Army Corps of Engineers National Contractor of the Year Award for Civil Works Projects in 1994.

Miramax investment
In 2010, Tutor was a lead investor in the $650 million purchase of Miramax Films from The Walt Disney Company, investing between US$35 million and US$50 million.  The acquisition started with a lavish party that included Rob Lowe and  Jamie-Lynn Sigler. In 2013, he sold his stake to the Qatar Investment Authority.

Philanthropy
Tutor serves on the Board of Trustees of his alma mater, USC. Tutor gifted USC The Ronald Tutor Campus Center and the USC Viterbi School of Engineering’s Tutor Hall, which are named in his honor.  He has received the Asa V. Call Alumni Achievement Award from USC. He donated US$2 million to the USC Institute of Armenian Studies in 2008. In 2014, his wife Alia endowed the Alia Tutor Chair in Reproductive Medicine at the Keck School of Medicine of USC.

Personal life
Tutor owned the Pegasus V yacht which he listed for sale in 2012. He has two sons with his wife, Alia, and three daughters from previous marriages. One of his daughters is Tracy Tutor, a main cast member on the real estate reality television program, Million Dollar Listing Los Angeles.

References

Living people
American people of Armenian descent
Businesspeople from Los Angeles
Marshall School of Business alumni
People from Hidden Hills, California
American chief executives
People from Sherman Oaks, Los Angeles
1940s births